Daniel Anthony Kerrigan (born 4 July 1982) is an English semi-professional footballer who plays as a defender or midfielder. He played in the Football League with Southend United, before dropping into non-League football.

Career
Kerrigan started his football career with Southend United, making his debut in the Third Division in the 1–1 away draw to Carlisle United on 2 October 1999, replacing Nathan Jones as a substitute in the 80th minute. He made a total of 19 appearances in all competitions for Southend, before being released in 2002. He signed for Billericay Town in summer 2002, following his release from Southend United. In April 2003, he joined Isthmian League Premier Division club Grays Athletic, following a budget cut at Billericay. George Borg then signed Kerrigan for Grays' rivals Hornchurch in September, Hornchurch were deducted one point in November, due to fielding Kerrigan in a 1–1 draw with Heybridge Swifts when he was not registered with the club. He went on to rejoin Billericay Town again, before being released along with Darren Blewitt in May 2008. Kerrigan signed for Heybridge Swifts in July 2009, before signing for Wivenhoe Town two months later in September.

References

External links

1982 births
Living people
Sportspeople from Basildon
English footballers
Isthmian League players
Southend United F.C. players
Billericay Town F.C. players
Grays Athletic F.C. players
Hornchurch F.C. players
Heybridge Swifts F.C. players
Wivenhoe Town F.C. players
Canvey Island F.C. players
English Football League players
Association football defenders
Association football midfielders